The 1964 All-Ireland Under-21 Hurling Championship was the inaugural staging of the All-Ireland Under-21 Hurling Championship. The championship began on 29 March 1964 and ended on 4 October 1964.

Tipperary won the title after defeating Wexford 8-9 to 3-1 in the final.

Teams

A total of eighteen teams entered the inaugural under-21 championship, however, there was a lop-sides nature to the competition due to the provincial structure. Galway, who had played in the Munster province at senior and minor levels since 1959, joined the other six traditional Munster teams and competed in the southern championship. Nine of the Leinster counties, including Louth, more notable as a Gaelic football stronghold, contested the eastern province. Antrim were the sole representatives from Ulster while Roscommon faced no competition as Connacht representatives.

Team summaries

Results

Leinster Under-21 Hurling Championship

First round

Second round

Semi-finals

Final

Munster Under-21 Hurling Championship

Quarter-finals

Semi-finals

Final

All-Ireland Under-21 Hurling Championship

Semi-finals

Final

Championship statistics

Top scorers

Top scorers overall

Top scorers in a single game

Miscellaneous
 Antrim and Roscommon were the sole representatives of Ulster and Connacht respectively due to a lack of competition.
 Tipperary become the first team to claim the senior and under-21 double. Earlier in the year the Tipperary senior team defeated Kilkenny to claim the Liam MacCarthy Cup.

External links
 Munster Under-21 Hurling Championship winning teams
 Leinster Under-21 Hurling Championship roll of honour

Under-21
All-Ireland Under-21 Hurling Championship